Walrus Island is an uninhabited Canadian arctic island in the Kivalliq Region, Nunavut. Located in Fisher Strait, it is situated between Southampton Island and Coats Island in northern Hudson Bay. Archaeological evidence indicates that the Sadlermiut were once active on the island.

References

Islands of Hudson Bay
Uninhabited islands of Kivalliq Region